Guanzhuang station is a station on Line 15 of the Beijing Subway. It was opened on December 28, 2014.

Name conflict
This station had the same English name as a station on the Batong line, also part of the Beijing Subway system.

In December 2019, the  station on Batong line changed spelling to Guaanzhuang.

Station layout
The station has an underground island platform.

Exits
There are 3 exits, lettered A, B, and C. Exit C is accessible.

Gallery

References

Railway stations in China opened in 2014
Beijing Subway stations in Chaoyang District